Kwangya Club (stylized in all caps) is a Korean mobile application created by South Korean company SM Brand Marketing, a subsidiary of SM Entertainment. It provides a membership-based official fan club service that will offer different community services for SM artists. The application is the first service provided by the metaverse brand, Kwangya. It was fully operational on September 1, 2022, after its pilot operations in July.

Development 
It was announced that SM Entertainment would open Kwangya Club, a fan community application and among the first services offered by the metaverse brand, Kwangya. The application would be operated by SM Brand Marketing, a subsidiary of SM. Artists from the company will be firstly employing the service. Additional K-pop artists and celebrities are also planned for future inclusion in the service. It is scheduled to be operational by September after its beta service for two months, starting from July 2022. Before the official launch of the service, SM artists will be consecutively recruited from June 23, 2022, beginning with NCT Dream and Aespa, where related details can be located through the artists' official social media accounts. SM's intention for the service production is to introduce the future metaverse entertainment world with the brand, Kwangya. This will symbolize the company's metaversal origin story of SM Culture Universe (SMCU), considered the core value and vision of future entertainment.

Features and tools 
Kwangya Club is a membership-based official fan club service that will deliver different community services for various K-pop artists and celebrity fans locally and internationally. The service will recruit free membership (Basic) and annual paid membership (Ace), which will receive particular benefits related to various services offered under the Kwangya brand. All names and groups listed would be part of the offered service.

 Kangta
 BoA
 TVXQ
 Super Junior
 Girls' Generation
 Shinee
 Exo
 Red Velvet
 NCT 127
 NCT Dream
 WayV
 Aespa

References

External links 

 Official website

SM Entertainment
Internet properties established in 2022
2022 software
Mobile software
Android (operating system) software
IOS software
Proprietary software